The following highways are numbered 577:

United States
Maryland
  Maryland Route 577

Territories
  Puerto Rico Highway 577